The Château de Mutigney is a castle in Mutigney, Jura, Franche-Comté, France.

History
It was built in the 15th century.

Architectural significance
It has been listed as an official historical monument by the French Ministry of Culture since 1971.

References

Châteaux in Jura (department)
Monuments historiques of Bourgogne-Franche-Comté